Dr Jaisiddeshwar Shivacharya Mahaswamiji  is an Indian politician and a member of parliament to the 17th Lok Sabha from Solapur Lok Sabha constituency, Maharashtra.He won the 2019 Indian general election being a Bharatiya Janata Party candidate.

References

India MPs 2019–present
Lok Sabha members from Maharashtra
Bharatiya Janata Party politicians from Maharashtra
1960 births
Living people
People from Solapur